Beypınarı can refer to:

 Beypınarı, Lapseki
 Beypınarı, Saimbeyli